In geophysical fluid dynamics, the f-plane approximation is an approximation where the Coriolis parameter, denoted f, is set to a constant value. 

This approximation is frequently used for the analysis of highly idealized tropical cyclones. Using a constant Coriolis parameter prevents the formation of beta gyres which are largely responsible for the North-westward direction of most tropical cyclones. Rossby waves also depend on variations in f, and do not occur in the f-plane approximation. 

In reality, the Coriolis parameter varies with latitude, and so the f-plane approximation is not appropriate when considering flows over large length scales. The f-plane approximation is also poor near the equator, where variations in f are on the same order of magnitude as f. The beta plane approximation is an improvement on the f-plane approximation which takes leading-order variations in f into account.

References

 Isaac Held: Rotating radiative-convective equilibrium

See also
Beta plane
Coriolis effect
Coriolis frequency

Atmospheric dynamics